Rail services in the West of England refer to passenger rail journeys made in the Bristol commuter area. 17 million passenger rail journeys were made in 2019-20 within the Gloucestershire, Wiltshire and Bristol/Bath region.

Services in the West of England

CrossCountry (XC)
 Bristol Temple Meads - Manchester Piccadilly (Extensions to Paignton) 
 Plymouth - Edinburgh Waverley (Extensions to Glasgow and Aberdeen)

Great Western Railway (GWR)
 South West/Bristol Temple Meads - London Paddington (via Bath Spa)
 Swansea/Cardiff - London Paddington (via Bristol Parkway)
 Bristol Parkway - Weston-super-Mare
 Great Malvern/Gloucester - Westbury/Weymouth
 Cardiff Central - Portsmouth Harbour 
 Cardiff Central - Taunton
 Bristol Temple Meads - Avonmouth/Severn Beach

South Western Railway (SWR)
 Yeovil Junction/Frome - Salisbury/London Waterloo

Main destinations
There is usually a direct weekday service from Bristol Parkway & Bristol Temple Meads to these destinations:

Stations

Current stations

Heritage stations
This is a list of stations currently open on heritages line.

Proposed stations
This is a list of proposed railway stations in the West of England. (This list includes some former stations)

Former stations
This is a list of former stations in the West of England area.

Railway lines
There are six railway lines running through Bristol.

Bristol to Exeter line

The Bristol to Exeter line runs between Bristol and Exeter via the Nailsea, Weston-super-Mare, Bridgwater and Taunton. It is served by local First Great Western services, and used by Cross-Country and Intercity trains headed towards Plymouth.

Cross-Country Route

The North-East/South-West route (sometimes simply The Cross-Country Route) is the major British rail route running from South West England or Cardiff via Bristol, Birmingham, Derby and Sheffield to North-East England and Scotland. It includes some of the longest inter-city rail journeys in the UK, e.g. Penzance to Aberdeen. It remains a major freight route, although now largely usurped by the M5, M6 and M1 motorways.

The route shares parts of the Great Western Main Line, Midland Main Line, Sheffield to Hull Line, the East Coast Main Line and the core Cardiff-Bristol-Birmingham-Derby route.

In November 2018 tracks were doubled from Bristol Temple Meads through Lawrence Hill to Filton Abbey Wood stations to increase capacity, back to the original four tracks.

Great Western Main Line

The Great Western Main Line is a main line railway in England that runs westwards from London Paddington station to Temple Meads station in Bristol.

Severn Beach Line

The route runs from Bristol Temple Meads to Severn Beach via Lawrence Hill, Stapleton Road, Montpelier, Redland, Clifton Down, Sea Mills, Shirehampton, Avonmouth, St Andrews Road before reaching terminus at Severn Beach. The journey takes approximately 45 minutes.

Following a successful campaign by FOSBR (Friends of Suburban Bristol Railway), the Severn Beach Line is going to have an increased frequency from December 2007 to March 2010. It is hoped this will pave the way for better services across the conurbation. An additional train will operate on the line meaning services should be at the least every 40 mins.

South Wales Main Line

The South Wales Main Line is a branch of the Great Western Main Line. It diverges from the main line at Wootton Bassett near Swindon, first calling at Bristol Parkway, after which the line continues through the Severn Tunnel into South Wales.

Wessex Main Line

The Wessex Main Line is the railway line from Bristol Temple Meads to Southampton. Diverging from this route is the Heart of Wessex Line from Westbury to Weymouth.

Proposed light rail or rapid transit

In November 2016, the West of England Local Enterprise Partnership began a consultation process on their Transport Vision Summary Document, outlining potential light rail/tram routes from the city centre to Bristol Airport, the eastern and north west fringes of the city, and a route along the A4 road to Bath. By 2017, this proposal had changed to a mass transit network with potential for underground sections, linking the city centre with the northern and eastern fringes of the city and the airport.

Train operators

Current train operators

Former train operators

There have also been a number of other companies pre-nationalisation, including:
Great Western Railway
Midland Railway
Bristol and Gloucester Railway
Birmingham and Bristol Railway
Bristol Port Railway and Pier
Bristol and North Somerset Railway
Portishead Railway

MetroWest

MetroWest is a current initiative in the West of England area to improve local rail services by reopening disused rail lines and stations and improving existing services. Phase One includes reopening the Portishead railway line to passenger traffic and improving services to the Severn Beach Line and Bath Spa. Phase Two will see the Henbury railway line reopen, along with half-hourly services between Weston-super-Mare and Yate. The phases are due to open in 2019 and 2021 respectively.

The West of England Local Enterprise Partnership also produced a Key Principles Report in November 2015 discussing future potential transport projects for the West of England region, including new rail transit based options referred to as MetroWest++. The options outlined include reopening the Thornbury Branch Line, a Yate to Bath route, the use of tram train technology, a link to the city centre and a connection to Bristol Airport.

See also
MetroWest (Bristol)
Public transport in Bristol
Friends of Suburban Bristol Railways

References

External links

Rail transport in Bristol